Scandal Street may refer to:
 Scandal Street (1938 film), an American drama film
 Scandal Street (1925 film), an American silent drama film